Nina is an upcoming Maldivian crime thriller film directed by Ilyas Waheed. Produced by Asim Ali and Ahmed Wahyd under IFilms, the film stars Nuzuhath Shuaib in titular role while debutant Sharaf Abdulla, Mariyam Rasheedha and Mariyam Shakeela feature in pivotal roles.

Cast 
 Nuzuhath Shuaib as Nina
 Sharaf Abdulla
 Mariyam Rasheedha
 Nathasha Jaleel
 Mariyam Shakeela
 Hamdhoon Farooq
 Ali Yooshau
 Ali Inaz
 Hassan Shinan
 Ibrahim Shaif
 Hussain Shamih Mohamed
 Aisha Ali
 Ahmed Rasheedh

Development
Following the success of Bavathi (2019), director Ilyas Waheed announced Nina in August 2019 with a cast including Nuzuhath Shuaib, debutant Sharaf Abdulla and Mohamed Jumayyil. After completing the shoot in Male', the cast and crew departed to Laamu atoll on 4 February 2020. As required for the film, Shuaib trained in martial arts. Shooting for the film ended in March 2020. In mid-2020, it was reported that veteran actress Mariyam Rasheedha has joined the cast of the film after a break of more than two decades. Following the child abuse allegation over Jumayyil, the production studio severed ties with him and affirmed that he will not be involved in the marketing and promotion of the film, though no confirmation was given by the studio if his role will be retained in the film or replaced.

Release
The film was scheduled for theatrical release in late 2020, but was postponed due to the COVID-19 pandemic.

References

Maldivian thriller films
Upcoming films
Films postponed due to the COVID-19 pandemic
Films shot in the Maldives